Adam Beechey (born 1981 in Tasmania) is an Australian racing driver.

Beechey's career began in the 1990s, and since then he has competed in a wide range of series and vehicles in Australia, from the Tasmanian Super Sedan Series to the Commodore Cup National Series.

After winning the championship in 2010, 2011 and 2012, Beechey became one of only two drivers to win the Commodore Cup title three times in a row, with the other being five-time champion Geoff Emery. Beechey was also the last driver to win the series after the category folded at the end of 2012. Beechey is also a three-time winner of the Ashley Cooper Memorial Trophy.

Career results

References

External links
 

1981 births
Living people
Australian racing drivers